In thermodynamics, explosive boiling or phase explosion is a method whereby a superheated metastable liquid undergoes an explosive liquid-vapor phase transition into a stable two-phase state because of a massive homogeneous nucleation of vapor bubbles. This concept was pioneered by M. M. Martynyuk in 1976 and then later advanced by Fucke and Seydel.

Mechanism

Explosive boiling can be best described by a p-T phase diagram. Figure on right shows a typical p-T phase diagram of a substance. The binodal line or the coexistence curve is a thermodynamic state where at that specific temperature and pressure, liquid and vapor can coexist. The spinodal line on right is the boundary of absolute instability of a solution to decomposition into multiple phases. A typical heating process is shown using red ink.

If the heating process is relatively slow, the liquid has enough time to relax to an equilibrium state and the liquid follows the binodal curve, the Clausius–Clapeyron relation is still valid. During this time heterogeneous evaporation occurs in the substance with bubbles nucleating from impurity sites, surfaces, grain boundaries etc. 

On the other hand, if the heating process is fast enough that the substance cannot reach binodal curve through heterogeneous boiling, the liquid becomes superheated with its temperature above boiling point at a given pressure. System then shifts away from the binodal and continues to follow the red curve and thus approaches towards spinodal. Near the critical temperature thermodynamic properties like specific heat, density varies rapidly as shown on the figure at right. Density and entropy undergoes largest fluctuation. During this time it is possible to have a large density fluctuation in a very small volume. This fluctuation of density results in the nucleation of a bubble. The bubble nucleation process occurs homogeneously everywhere in the substance. The rate of bubble nucleation and vapor sphere growth rate increases exponentially closer to the critical temperature. The increasing nucleation prevents the system from going to the spinodal. When the bubble radius reaches the critical size it continues to expand and eventually explodes resulting a mixture of gas and droplets which is termed as explosive boiling or phase explosion.

At the beginning, explosive boiling was used by Martynyuk to calculate the critical temperature of metals. He used electric resistance to heat up metal wire. Later explosive boiling was found to occur while using ultra fast femtosecond laser ablation. Although this kind of explosive boiling should occur by any mechanism whereby the temperature of the liquid is rapidly raised close to the critical temperature of the substance.

References

Physical chemistry